Arjun Nandhakumar (born 22 August 1986) is an Indian actor, who appears in Malayalam films. He made his debut in 2012 with Casanovva directed by Rosshan Andrrews.

Early life and education

Arjun Nandhakumar was born in Chennithala, Kerala. He completed his primary education at Sree Bhuvaneswari English Medium High School, Mannar. He did his BDS at Government Dental College, Thiruvananthapuram. Before entering the film industry, he worked as a model. He married Divya Pillai on 21 June 2021.

Acting career

Arjun Nandhakumar started his career in films through the romantic action thriller Casanovva (2012) directed by Rosshan Andrrews, starring Mohanlal in lead. He played supporting role, Kiran. Arjun's most noted films are  Grandmaster (2012), Radio Jockey (2013), 8:20 (2014), Medulla Oblongata (2014), The Dolphins (2014), Jamna Pyari (2015), Su.. Su... Sudhi Vathmeekam (2015). His recent films are Oppam (2016), Ore Mugham, Marupadi, Masterpiece (2017) and Anjaam Pathiraa (2020).

Apart from acting, Arjun is a cricket player. He is a prominent player of Kerala Strikers which take part in the Celebrity Cricket League. He had been a key player for the Kerala team and has won the Best Player awards.

Filmography

References

https://www.filmibeat.com/malayalam/news/2017/mammootty-s-masterpiece-here-is-a-new-update-262309.html

https://www.youtube.com/watch?v=v8tmD2YcoyI

External links
 

Indian male film actors
Male actors in Malayalam cinema
1986 births
Living people
People from Alappuzha district
Male actors from Kerala
21st-century Indian male actors
Cricketers from Kerala